Craig Hutchison (born 4 December 1974) is an Australian journalist, sports broadcaster and businessman. Based in Melbourne, Hutchison often covers AFL topics and breaking news stories relating to the code.

Early life and career
Hutchinson was born in Warragul, Victoria. He commenced his career as a journalist in 1994 as a cadet with the Herald Sun newspaper. Two years later, he moved to Sport 927, where he was producer of the Kevin Bartlett and Dr Turf Big Sports Breakfast Show for approximately one year. He then joined Channel Ten as a journalist and broke sport stories including Neil Balme's sacking at the Melbourne Football Club as senior coach, Alastair Lynch's drug hearing with the AFL, and the subsequent resignation of the Brisbane chairman following the story.

Television career

Seven Network
In 1999, he joined the Seven Network and was promoted to chief football reporter, appearing on the nationally broadcast Sportsworld every Sunday. He was also 'fill-in' sports anchor for Seven News. He also worked in commentary as a caller in 2001.

Controversy
In 2004, he was at the centre of controversy when he wrongfully said St Kilda player Justin Koschitzke was being interviewed by police in relation to sexual misconduct allegations. Hutchison said Koschitzke and teammate Stephen Milne were involved, when it was actually allegedly Milne and Leigh Montagna. Channel Seven was forced to issue an apology to St Kilda and Koschitzke, and they issued a retraction. Stephen Milne and Leigh Montagna were subsequently advised by Victoria Police that no charges would be laid.

Nine Network
In 2007, Hutchison left the Seven Network to join Channel Nine's football team. It was considered a shock defection due to the fact that Seven, who he had been with for eight years, won a share of the telecast rights to AFL matches for the first time since 2001.

As part of Hutchison's role with Nine, he became host of Nine's newly introduced talk show Footy Classified. He was also appointed as a reporter for The Footy Show, The Sunday Footy Show, and National Nine News, with his first major stories being an exclusive interview with Jonathan Hay, as well as a trip to Malibu, California, to follow Ben Cousins as he was admitted to a drug rehabilitation centre.

On Sunday, 10 May 2009, he hosted the Channel 9 show TAC Cup Future Stars, which was aimed at focusing on stories and personalities of the TAC Cup.

In 2011, Hutchison played for Victoria in the annual EJ Whitten Legends Gamekicking a banana goal from nearly 40 metres out. As of 2022, a video of the goal has been viewed in excess of 1.8 million times on YouTube alone. Hutchison scored two goals in the game. 

On 28 November 2012, Nine announced that Hutchison would replace Simon O'Donnell as host of The Sunday Footy Show as of 2013. In late 2016, it was announced that Hutchison would replace James Brayshaw as co-host of The Footy Show in 2017.

Indeed, Hutchison went on to host The Footy Show for 2017, but Craig's tenure as The Footy Show co-host lasted less than 1 season, being dumped on 21 July 2017 after the show's ratings were beaten by the Seven Network's The Front Bar for the third time in four weeks.  
He was replaced by The Footy Show's inaugural host, Eddie McGuire, who returned after more than a decade away.

Radio career
Hutchison joined Triple M in 1997, and two years later he co-hosted the top-rating Ralphy and Hutch show, and he called AFL games every Saturday night from 1997 to 2005.  Hutchison has shared Sundays with Sam Newman, James Brayshaw, Stephen Quartermain and Jason Dunstall, providing a preview of the day's game.

In 2006, he joined 3AW's football commentary team with Rex Hunt. In June 2007, Hutchison was sacked from 3AW. Management of the radio station took the action following a ratings plummet for its Saturday night football coverage.

In March 2008, Hutchison joined SEN 1116 and, since 2009, co-hosts Off The Bench on Saturday morning with Liam Pickering and Dr Turf.

Sports Entertainment Network
Hutchison is the CEO and part-owner of Sports Entertainment Network (founded as Crocmedia), an Australian media content provider. It was established in 2006 by Hutchison and business partner, fellow journalist James Swanwick, with the backing of private investors.

The company creates and provides programs for television and radio stations as well as creates online content and live entertainment events for corporate businesses and media outlets. They also manage media personalities.

Awards
Hutchison has been the recipient of many awards. These include being five-time winner of the AFL Media Association Awards' 'Best Electronic News Reporter'  and winning a Quill (Victorian Journalism Award) for Best TV News Report in 2002.

References

External links

 Crocmedia website

1974 births
Living people
Australian rules football commentators
Australian television presenters
People from Warragul